Jesus Pinto da Luz (born January 15, 1987) is a Brazilian model and DJ.

Early life and family
Luz was born in Rio de Janeiro. He is the son of a hairdresser and public official in the Rio de Janeiro city government. His name was given to him by his father who always admired Jesus Christ as the most philosophical mind of all time. His surname Luz means “light” in Portuguese. Luz has two younger half brothers. As a child he moved frequently, especially after his parents split when he was 5 years old. When he was a teenager he pursued modeling and acting, working odd jobs, including as a salesman at a surf shop in Ipanema. Luz grew up in a musical environment, his uncle used to play in a rock band in Rio de Janeiro.

Fashion career
Luz signed the first contract in 2005 for a modeling agency "40 Graus Models". He was hired by Sergio Mattos for whom he worked for three years. In 2006, he spent six months in New York, living with an aunt and learning English. Luz obtained the first modeling job in his hometown at a fashion show "Fashion Rio 2007". During that period he also studied acting at the training school for actors "Casa das Artes de Laranjeiras". He obtained a small part in the television series Pegadoras (The sinful) which was broadcast on Rede Globo. In 2008 Luz signed the contract with Ford Models becoming one of the highest paid male models in the world. That same year Luz got his first big international job when Steven Klein chose him to pose alongside Madonna for the W magazine photo shoot. Rumors that the relationship moved from staged photographs to real life began in December 2008 when reports from the Brazilian press surfaced which made Luz internationally known. In 2009 he featured on the summer cover of L'Officiel Hommes fashion magazine. In 2009 Luz was also one of the faces for Dolce & Gabbana photographed by Steven Klein. He was also photographed by Tom Munro for Pepe Jeans alongside Hanne Gabe Odiele and Agnete Hegelund. In Milan Fashion Week 2009 Luz debuted as Dolce & Gabbana exclusive model. In 2010 he appeared in Interview magazine editorial photographed by Mikael Jansson.

Music career
Luz had a lot of DJ and musician friends in school, where he played flute. He got into DJing in 2010. Luz used to watch his friends do it and started to go to all of the electronic parties. He attended the "Dubspot", a DJ school in New York City, for three months where he was taught how to mix, how the crossfader works, and all the basic stuff to deal with the equipment. He is interested in electronic music—trance, electro-house, progressive house and tech-house. Later Luz landed high-profile gigs. For the 90-minute set he was spinning on his second professional D.J. job he was being paid around $15,000.

Kabbalah
Luz practises Kabbalah. He was introduced to Kabbalah by his ex-girlfriend Madonna and has also studied Buddhism and yoga. “I’m just looking for something to make me strong, and Kabbalah has given me that,” Luz said.

Videography

Music video

Accolades 
In 2010, he won the NewNowNext Awards for Cause You’re Hot, thanking her then girlfriend Madonna, in his acceptance speech.

References

External links 

 

1987 births
Living people
People from Rio de Janeiro (city)
Brazilian male models
Musicians from Rio de Janeiro (city)
Brazilian DJs
Club DJs
Electronic dance music DJs